The 1995 Berlin state election was held on 22 October 1995 to elect the members of the 13th Abgeordnetenhaus of Berlin. The incumbent grand coalition between the Christian Democratic Union (CDU) and Social Democratic Party (SPD) retained government. CDU leader Eberhard Diepgen was re-elected as Mayor.

Parties
The table below lists parties represented in the 12th Abgeordnetenhaus of Berlin.

Election result

|-
! colspan="2" | Party
! Votes
! %
! +/-
! Seats 
! +/-
! Seats %
|-
| bgcolor=| 
| align=left | Christian Democratic Union (CDU)
| align=right| 625,005
| align=right| 37.4
| align=right| 3.0
| align=right| 87
| align=right| 14
| align=right| 42.2
|-
| bgcolor=| 
| align=left | Social Democratic Party (SPD)
| align=right| 393,245
| align=right| 23.6
| align=right| 6.8
| align=right| 55
| align=right| 21
| align=right| 26.7
|-
| bgcolor=| 
| align=left | Party of Democratic Socialism (PDS)
| align=right| 244,196
| align=right| 14.6
| align=right| 5.4
| align=right| 34
| align=right| 11
| align=right| 16.5
|-
| bgcolor=| 
| align=left | Alliance 90/The Greens (Grüne)
| align=right| 219,990
| align=right| 13.2
| align=right| 3.8
| align=right| 30
| align=right| 7
| align=right| 14.6
|-
! colspan=8|
|-
| bgcolor=| 
| align=left | The Republicans (REP)
| align=right| 45,462
| align=right| 2.7
| align=right| 0.4
| align=right| 0
| align=right| ±0
| align=right| 0
|-
| bgcolor=| 
| align=left | Free Democratic Party (FDP)
| align=right| 42,391
| align=right| 2.5
| align=right| 4.6
| align=right| 0
| align=right| 18
| align=right| 0
|-
|  
| align=left | The Grays – Gray Panthers (Graue)
| align=right| 28,356
| align=right| 1.7
| align=right| New
| align=right| 0
| align=right| New
| align=right| 0
|-
| bgcolor=|
| align=left | Others
| align=right| 70,541
| align=right| 4.2
| align=right| 
| align=right| 0
| align=right| ±0
| align=right| 0
|-
! align=right colspan=2| Total
! align=right| 1,669,186
! align=right| 100.0
! align=right| 
! align=right| 206
! align=right| 35
! align=right| 
|-
! align=right colspan=2| Voter turnout
! align=right| 
! align=right| 68.6
! align=right| 12.2
! align=right| 
! align=right| 
! align=right| 
|}

Notes

References

State election, 1995
1995 elections in Germany
1995 in Berlin
October 1995 events in Europe